Fontabelle is located in the parish of Saint Michael, Barbados.  Located just to the North-west of the capital city Bridgetown, Fontabelle is a heavily populated area.

Found in the Fontabelle area include: the Deep Water Harbour and  the Kensington Oval cricket stadium.

During the months of March and April, the area where Fontabelle meets Kensington Oval is very alive; night-life emerges after the games (there are more than 5 temporary bar and restaurant locations on the outskirts of the stadium) and both visitors and locals enjoy Caribbean cuisine and Caribbean rhythms with Caribbean people - a complete mixture of cultures and love for the islands.

References

Saint Michael, Barbados